Ronald Wayne Shelton (born September 15, 1945) is an American film director and screenwriter and former minor league baseball infielder. Shelton is known for the many films he has made about sports. His 1988 film Bull Durham, based in part on his own baseball experiences, earned him an Academy Award nomination for  Best Original Screenplay.

A former minor league baseball infielder in Baltimore's farm system, Shelton played with the Bluefield Orioles, Stockton Ports, Florida Instructional League Orioles, Dallas–Fort Worth Spurs and Rochester Red Wings from 1967 through 1971.

Film career
After working on the scripts for a number of films, including co-writing the Nick Nolte and Gene Hackman political drama Under Fire, Shelton made his directorial debut with Bull Durham in 1988. Set in the world of minor league baseball, the romantic comedy stars Kevin Costner, Susan Sarandon and Tim Robbins. Shelton's screenplay netted him multiple awards, including Best Original Script from the Writers Guild of America and Best Script from the US National Society of Film Critics. It was also nominated for an Academy Award.

In 1990, Ron Shelton had received a three-year first look writing and producing deal with 20th Century Fox.

Shelton worked with Costner again on the 1996 golf-themed romantic comedy Tin Cup. Other films as writer and director included the boxing comedy Play It to the Bone, a critical and commercial flop, and acclaimed 1992 comedy White Men Can't Jump, starring Woody Harrelson and Wesley Snipes as two basketball hustlers. Calling the latter film "very smart and very funny," and "not simply a basketball movie," critic Roger Ebert wrote that Shelton "knows how his characters talk and sound, and how they get into each other's minds with non-stop talking and boasting."

Shelton has also written and directed two biopics: Cobb, in which Tommy Lee Jones portrayed record-breaking baseballer Ty Cobb, and Blaze, which starred Paul Newman as colourful Louisiana Governor Earl Long. He wrote or co-wrote other sports-themed films including The Best of Times, starring Robin Williams and Kurt Russell as former football teammates; the basketball drama Blue Chips, starring Nick Nolte, and a boxing comedy, The Great White Hype, starring Samuel L. Jackson.

He also directed two Los Angeles-based crime films, Dark Blue, a drama starring Kurt Russell, and Hollywood Homicide, a comedy with Harrison Ford and Josh Hartnett.

In 2022, Shelton received the Leonard Maltin Award at the Coronado Island Film Festival.

Personal life
Shelton grew up in Montecito, California, the oldest of four brothers. He is an alumnus of Santa Barbara High School and of the University of Arizona and Westmont College.

Shelton is married to Canadian-born actress Lolita Davidovich, who has appeared in several of his films, including taking the title role of Blaze Starr in Blaze. The couple have two children and reside in Los Angeles and Ojai, California. Shelton has two daughters with his first wife, filmmaker Lois Shelton.

On July 7, 2017, Shelton was inducted into the Rochester Red Wings Hall of Fame.

Filmography

References

External links

1945 births
Living people
American male screenwriters
Baseball players from Arizona
Baseball players from California
Bluefield Orioles players
Dallas–Fort Worth Spurs players
Film directors from California
Florida Instructional League Orioles players
People from Greater Los Angeles
People from Montecito, California
Rochester Red Wings players
Screenwriters from Arizona
Screenwriters from California
Stockton Ports players
University of Arizona alumni
Westmont Warriors baseball players
Writers from Whittier, California
Writers Guild of America Award winners